Queen Charlotte Bay (Spanish: Bahia San Julian ) is a bay/fjord on the west coast of West Falkland. It is one of the two main bays on that coast, the other being King George Bay. Islands in the bay include Weddell Island, and Fox Island. It has an extremely intricate shoreline, and is regularly battered by westerly winds.

References

Bays of West Falkland